is a Japanese writer of mystery novels and historical fiction as well as a historical researcher. He was formerly a news reporter for TBS and since April 2012 has worked as a visiting professor at Shuchiin University.

Career and writings 
Motohiko Izawa graduated from Chitose Tokyo Metropolitan High School, now Roka Tokyo Metropolitan High School, and from the faculty of law at Waseda University. While he was in university his story Tōsaku no Hōfuku ("Retaliation for Perversion") was a candidate for the Edogawa Rampo Prize. After graduation he joined TBS as a news reporter. In 1980, at the time he was working at the politics section of the news bureau, his novel Sarumaru Genshi-ko ("Illusionary Travel Around Sarumaru") won the 26th Edogawa Rampo Prize. Sarumaru Genshi-ko is a both detective fiction and a historical novel in which the protagonist mentally travels in time under the influence of medications and, in a science-fiction style twist, amalgamates with the mind of Shinobu Orikuchi and solves crimes in Orikuchi's time as well as unravelling the mystery of the Heian-era iroha and the relationship of the poets Sarumaru no Taifu and Kakinomoto no Hitomaro. In 1985 Izawa left TBS to become a full-time writer.

Most of Izawa's novels are on the plane of what he calls historical mysteries, in which he ties modern-day murders into his detective fiction while taking the mysteries of history as his themes. In addition, he also works on pure historical fiction, and he develops his own unique theories on history, particularly since 1992 in the successive instalments of his popular series of non-fiction history books, Gyakusetsu no Nihonshi ("Paradoxical Japanese History").

In his early days he also wrote fantasy and the novelization of the Nintendo game Dragon Buster. Recently he has turned his attention outside of Japanese history and has released books such as a series of “intensive courses” on the religions of Buddhism, Shintoism, Confucianism, Judaism, Christianity, and Islam.

Views on Japanese history 
Izawa has a strong command of diverse historical materials and treats the society and history of Japan from an original point of view. He sees as the animating undercurrents of Japan the unconscious faith of the Japanese people in kotodama, onryo, kegare, and wa, or harmony.

Izawa thinks highly of and has been heavily influenced by Shunshin Chin and Takeshi Umehara. He reveres Umehara, a pioneer of the view that Japanese history has been shaped by the fear of onryo, as being “someone who is like a beloved teacher to me”. The theories about Kakinomoto no Hitomaro's life espoused in his book Sarumaru Genshi-ko are taken from Umehara's Minasoko no Uta.

His style of writing history takes into account his thorough dissection and criticism of “the three great flaws of the study of history”, which include the “authoritarianism” of professional historical societies, an excessively empirical reliance on historical documents as opposed to the unsaid or unconscious factors of history, and the ignoring or belittling of mystical and religious aspects.

He is vocal about problems with the way Japanese people perceive their history centering on World War II and frequently contributes articles on the subject to journals of opinion such as the biweekly magazine SAPIO. He is critical of the stance of the mass media towards history including the Asahi Shimbun which he blasted in a book co-written with Yoshinori Kobayashi. Izawa is affiliated with the Japanese Society for History Textbook Reform and is an active denier of the Nanjing massacre. As a member of this society, his books were among those owned by Nishi Library in Funabashi which were destroyed in 2001 by the librarians. In 2005 the Supreme Court ordered the library to pay compensation for the loss.

Criticism 
After the Chuo Gishi Kai, a group dedicated to studying the 47 ronin, wrote a detailed and scathing criticism of one volume in his Gyakusetsu no Nihonshi subtitled “The Mystery of Chushingura”, it became clear that Izawa was not at all able to read old Japanese documents. The late historian Eiichi Matsushima who was a professor at Waseda University criticized him on this matter and at one point Izawa changed his views, though he retracted his change of heart after Matsushima's death.

In a 12 December 2007 column for the magazine SAPIO he attacked Kenzaburō Ōe’s 1970 essay Okinawa Note but when quoting similar criticism by Ayako Sono from a 28 November column in the same magazine he conspicuously fixated on Sono’s infamous misreading by swapping her use of kyokai (巨魁 meaning ringleader) with the correct kyokai (巨塊 meaning colossal mass).

TV appearances 
He has made appearances on many television programs including "Takajin no Sokomade Itte Iinkai" and "Wake up!" on Yomiuri TV and "Koko ga Hen da yo Nihonjin" on TBS, and is the Monday commentator on "Yoshida Terumi Soko daiji na Koto" on NCB. He has also served as a regular commentator on the TV show “Historical Discoveries” on NHK.

In recent years his TV appearances in Tokyo have been scarce but he continues to appear in Kansai, including several times on "Be-bop High Heel" on Asahi TV. He even appeared on "Hikari Ota's If I Were Prime Minister... Secretary Tanaka" in which he analyzed the Japanese people's religious outlook and belief in kotodama and a lively debate ensued based on his cherished theories.

Other views and activities 
He advocates democratic fundamentals in both Japanese society and politics. In January 2012 he went to work at the headquarters of the Chūkyō Dokuritsu Senryaku Honbu which seeks to abolish Aichi Prefecture and elevate Nagoya to metropolis-level status as Tokyo already is. He expressed his sympathy to Koichi Kato when his home was burned down and on the occasion argued for a reappraisal of his political record.

In 2010 Izawa also worked on a committee to commemorate the 1300th anniversary of the moving of the Japanese capital to Heijo-kyo.

He loves baseball and partly because of his Nagoya origins, he is also a fan of the Chunichi Dragons.

Works

Sole author 

猿丸幻視行 講談社、1980　のち文庫
本廟寺焼亡 講談社 1981  のち文庫
復活一九八五  角川ノベルズ 1982　「邪神復活」文庫
六歌仙暗殺考  講談社ノベルス 1982　のち文庫
修道士の首 織田信長 推理帳 講談社ノベルス 1983　のち文庫
トラップアンドエラー  光風社出版 1983　「葬られた遺書」光文社文庫
殺人ドライブ・ロード  徳間ノベルス 1983  のち文庫　
悪魔の復活 角川ノベルズ 1984 のち文庫　
陰画の構図 双葉ノベルス 1984　のち文庫
ダビデの星の暗号 探偵は 芥川龍之介 講談社ノベルス　1985　のち文庫、角川文庫　　
五つの首 織田信長推理帳 講談社ノベルス 1985　のち文庫　
光と影の武蔵 切支丹秘録 実業之日本社 1985 (Joy novels) のち角川文庫、講談社文庫　　
復活計画No3  角川ノベルズ 1985 のち文庫、「迷宮決戦」ハルキ文庫
義経幻殺録  講談社 1986　のち文庫、角川文庫　　
叛逆王ユニカ 角川文庫 1986 のちハルキ文庫　
欲の無い犯罪者 光風社出版 1986 のち講談社文庫
暗鬼 秀吉と家康の推理と苦悩 光風社出版 1987　のち新潮文庫
ドラゴンバスター 角川文庫 1987
パレスタ奪回作戦 叛逆王ユニカ2 角川文庫 1987　のちハルキ文庫　
死にたくなかった女たち 双葉ノベルス 1987　のち文庫
忠臣蔵元禄十五年の反逆  新潮社 1988 (新潮ミステリー倶楽部) のち文庫　
芭蕉魔星陣  角川ノベルズ 1988　のち文庫、講談社文庫　　
信濃戦雲録 第1－4巻 集英社 1988－89 のち改題「野望」祥伝社文庫　　
邪悪のアーク  角川ノベルズ 1988　「アーク殲滅」ハルキ文庫　
マダム・ロスタンの伝言 永源寺峻のミステリ・ファイル 実業之日本社 1988 のち集英社文庫　
義経はここにいる  講談社 1989　のち文庫、徳間文庫
隠された帝 天智天皇 暗殺事件 祥伝社 1990
七つの迷路 井沢元彦ミステリーワールド 阿部出版 1990　のち 広済堂文庫
降魔の帝王 双葉社 1991　のち文庫　
卑弥呼 伝説 地に降りた神々 実業之日本社 1991　のち集英社文庫　
信玄の呪縛  天山出版 1991　のち角川文庫　
葉隠 三百年の陰謀 徳間書店 1991　のち文庫
言霊 1－2　祥伝社 1991－97　のち 黄金文庫]　　
恨の法廷 日本経済新聞社 1991　のち徳間文庫
謀略の首 織田信長推理帳 講談社 1992　のち講談社文庫　
天正十二年のクローディアス 井沢元彦自選歴史ミステリー集 有学書林 1992　のち小学館文庫
天皇になろうとした将軍 それからの太平記/ 足利義満 のミステリー 小学館 1992　のち文庫　
「言霊の国」解体新書 小学館 1993　のち文庫　
洛陽城の栄光 信長秘録 世界文化社 1993　のち 幻冬舎 文庫　
銀魔伝　1－2 中央公論社 1993－94 のち文庫
井沢元彦の世界宗教講座 「生き方」の原理がなぜ異なるのか 徳間書店 1993　のち文庫、「世界の［宗教と戦争］講座」改題文庫　
逆説の日本史 1－17 小学館 1993‐　のち文庫、『週刊ポスト』連載中
神霊の国日本 禁断の日本史 ベストセラーズ 1994　のちワニ文庫　
黎明の叛逆者 秋田書店 1994　「日本史の叛逆者 私説・壬申の乱」角川文庫
顔の無い神々 スコラ 1994　のちハルキ文庫　
穢れと茶碗 日本人は、なぜ軍隊が嫌いか 祥伝社 1994　のち文庫　
覇者　信濃戦雲録 第2部 祥伝社 1995　のち文庫　
歴史謎物語 隠された真相を推理する 広済堂出版 1995　のち文庫　
歴史if物語 何を問題として読むか 広済堂出版 1995  のち文庫　
GEN 『源氏物語』秘録 角川書店 1995　のち文庫「源氏物語はなぜ書かれたのか」
日本史再検討　1－3 世界文化社 1995－99 のち「神霊の国日本」ワニ文庫「誰が歴史を歪めたか」「誰が歴史を糺すのか」黄金文庫
虚報の構造オオカミ少年の系譜 朝日ジャーナリズムに異議あり 小学館 1995
小説「日本」人民共和国  光文社 1996　のち文庫　
だからミステリーは面白い 対論集 集英社文庫 1996
歴史の森の影法師  有學書林 1996　「歴史の嘘と真実」祥伝社
日本を殺す気か! 国を壊死させる官僚の論理 祥伝社 1996 (Non book)のち黄金文庫　
魔鏡の女王 読売新聞社 1996 のち集英社文庫　
日本再発見 古寺探訪ガイド 角川mini文庫 1997
歴史不思議物語 日本史の闇を照射する 廣済堂出版 1997
死ぬまでの僅かな時間  双葉社 1998　のち文庫　
織田信長伝 シミュレーション戦記覇望の日本編 光栄 1998 「日本史の叛逆者」角川文庫　
日本史漫遊 桜桃書房 1999　「激論歴史の嘘と真実」黄金文庫、原題で小学館文庫　　
憂国の世紀末 中央公論新社 1999　
平家物語 の怪 能で読み解く 源平盛衰記 世界文化社 1999
一千年の陰謀 平将門 の呪縛 角川書店 1999　のち文庫　
「言霊の国」の掟 日本社会のここがおかしい。徳間書店 2000　のち文庫　
逆説のニッポン歴史観 日本をダメにした「戦後民主主義」の正体 小学館 2000　のち文庫　
なぜ、日本では誰でも総理になれるのか!?　日本人の素朴な疑問　祥伝社、2001　
井沢元彦の未来講座 言霊社会とサイエンス 徳間書店 2001
歴史「再発見」物語 意外な実相を読み解く　広済堂出版、2002　のち文庫　
宮本武蔵 ・最強伝説の真実 歴史よもやま話 日本放送出版協会 2002　のち小学館文庫　
知の潮流 桜桃書房、2002　
いつから日本の"水と安全"はタダでなくなったのか　日本人の素朴な疑問　祥伝社、2002　
「拉致」事件と日本人　なぜ、長期間黙殺されたのか 祥伝社、2003　
なぜ中国人、韓国人に媚びるのか 新・逆説のニッポン歴史観 小学館 2003
日本人の心をとらえる3の霊力に迫る 旅行読売出版社 2003
虚報の構造 オオカミ少年の系譜 朝日ジャーナリズムに異議あり　小学館文庫　2003　
攘夷と護憲 歴史比較の日本原論　徳間書店、2004　のち文庫　　
日本史集中講義 点と点が線になる 祥伝社 2004　のち黄金文庫　
英傑の日本史　新撰組・幕末編　角川書店、2004　のち文庫　
ユダヤ・キリスト・イスラム集中講座 徳間書店、2004　のち文庫　
井沢元彦の英雄の世界史　広済堂出版、2004　のち文庫　
「反日」日本人の正体 (小学館, 2004) 
名城発見 戦国武将たちの知られざる城盗り物語 ベストセラーズ 2005　「封印された戦国名城史」ワニ文庫
逆説のアジア史紀行 小学館、2005
検証もうひとつの武将列伝　実業之日本社、2005 「真説「日本武将列伝」」小学館文庫
仏教・神道・儒教 集中講座　日本人だからかえって知らない　徳間書店、2005　のち文庫　
古寺歩きのツボ　仏像・建築・庭園を味わう 角川oneテーマ21 2005
英傑の日本史 源平争乱編 角川学芸出版 2006　のち文庫
井沢式「日本史入門」講座 1－5　徳間書店 2006－08 のち文庫　
英傑の日本史 信長・秀吉・家康編 角川学芸出版 2006　のち文庫　
封印された日本史 ベストセラーズ 2007
英傑の日本史 風林火山編 角川学芸出版 2007 のち文庫　
中国　地球人類の難題 小学館 2007
六点鐘は二度鳴る 小学館文庫 2008
英傑の日本史 上杉越後軍団編 角川学芸出版 2008
怨霊と鎮魂の日本芸能史 檜書店 2008
新・井沢式日本史集中講座 1192(いいくに)作ろう鎌倉幕府編 徳間書店 2009
井沢元彦の戦乱の日本史 小学館, 2009.12.
英傑の日本史 激闘織田軍団編 角川学芸出版 2009.8
「常識」の日本史 歴史の嘘と真実を見抜く PHPエディターズ・グループ 2009.7.
井沢式新ニッポン風土記 旅行読売出版社, 2010.3.
英傑の日本史 坂本龍馬編 角川学芸出版 2010.5.
新・井沢式日本史集中講座 「鎌倉新仏教」編 徳間書店, 2010.1.
新・井沢式日本史集中講座 「鎌倉幕府の崩壊」編 (国家を揺るがした後醍醐天皇の野望) 徳間書店, 2010.6.
人類を幸せにする国・日本 2010.11. 祥伝社新書
井沢元彦の学校では教えてくれない日本史の授業 PHPエディターズ・グループ 2011.2
英傑の日本史 浅井三姉妹編 角川学芸出版 2011.10
小説友情無限 孫文 を支えた日本男児　角川書店 2011.9.

As a co-author 

（樋口清之）神道からみたこの国の心 日本人の「内なる原理」を明かす 徳間書店 1995　のち文庫
（考古の森研究会）『縄文都市国家の謎 古代史大推理 驚異の「三内丸山遺跡 」全解読』 共編著 スコラ 1995
（中津文彦・高橋克彦）『歴史ミステリー講座』 新人物往来社 1997 『歴史ミステリー作家養成講座』 祥伝社 文庫
（小林よしのり）『朝日新聞の正義 逆説の(新)ゴーマニズム宣言』 小学館 1998
（小林惠子）『記紀』史学への挑戦状 現代思潮社 1998
（藤岡信勝）『NOといえる教科書 真実の日韓関係史』 祥伝社 1998
（古森義久・稲垣武）『朝日新聞の大研究』 扶桑社 2002）のち文庫
（金文学）『逆検定 中国国定教科書 中国人に教えてあげたい本当の中国史』 祥伝社 2005　のち黄金文庫　
（呉善花）『やっかいな隣人韓国の正体 なぜ「反日」なのに、日本に憧れるのか』 祥伝社 2006
（波多野秀行 漫画）『そして中国の崩壊が始まる』 飛鳥新社 2006 (マンガ入門シリーズ) 「マンガ中国崩壊」ゴマ文庫
天地人の戦国乱世名将・智将の時代 火坂雅志 共著 ベストセラーズ, 2009.4. ワニ文庫
朝鮮学校「歴史教科書」を読む 萩原遼共著 2011.11.祥伝社新書

See also 
Historical revisionism

References

External links 
 Motohiko Izawa’s Study – official website and e-mail newsletter 
 Weekly Column by Motohiko Izawa 

20th-century Japanese novelists
21st-century Japanese novelists
Japanese mystery writers
Edogawa Rampo Prize winners
Nanjing Massacre deniers
Japanese anti-communists
People from Nagoya
1954 births
Living people
Waseda University alumni